The Prix Iris for Most Successful Film Outside Quebec is an annual film award presented by Québec Cinéma as part of the Prix Iris awards program, to honour films made within the Cinema of Quebec which have had significant success beyond the province, both in English Canada and internationally.

For the purposes of the award, "success" is calculated as a weighted formula incorporating a variety of factors, including box office tallies, film festival bookings, awards and sales to international distributors. The award takes into account success attained within the eligibility period regardless of when the film was originally released; on two occasions to date, the same film has won the award two years in a row, and on two occasions films have had moderate success in their original year of release, making the shortlist but not being named as the winner, and then went on to win the award the following year.

Until 2016, it was known as the Jutra Award for Most Successful Film Outside Quebec in memory of influential Quebec film director Claude Jutra. Following the withdrawal of Jutra's name from the award, the 2016 award was presented under the name Québec Cinéma. The Prix Iris name was announced in October 2016.

The award was first presented at the 2nd Jutra Awards in 2000. For the first nine years of its existence, only the winner was named each year; beginning with the 11th Jutra Awards in 2009, an advance shortlist of films eligible for the award was announced.

2000s

2010s

2020s

References

Awards established in 2000
Most Successful
Quebec-related lists